Mats Tuve Magnusson (born 10 July 1963) is a Swedish former professional footballer who played as a striker. Starting off his career with Malmö FF, he is best remembered for his time with Benfica with which he won two league titles, reached two European Cup finals, and was the 1989–90 Primeira Liga top scorer. A full international between 1984 and 1990, he won 30 caps for the Sweden national team and represented his country at the 1990 FIFA World Cup.

Club career
Magnusson was born in Helsingborg. During his career he played for Malmö FF (two spells), Servette FC, S.L. Benfica and Helsingborgs IF. Upon his return home he helped the latter side, featuring a young Henrik Larsson, reach the Allsvenskan.

At the Lisbon club, where he arrived in 1987 as a replacement for fellow Scandinavian, Michael Manniche, Magnusson developed as a top flight goalscorer, winning two Primeira Liga championships and appearing at the European Cup finals in 1988 (lost to PSV Eindhoven in a penalty shoot-out) and 1990 (losing to A.C. Milan). In 1989–90, even though they lost to FC Porto in the league, he finished as top scorer of the competition with 33 goals in 32 games; during his time with Benfica he shared team with countrymen Jonas Thern (1989–92), Stefan Schwarz (1990–94) – also his teammates at Malmö – and coach Sven-Göran Eriksson (1989–92). His total of 87 goals in all official competitions made him Benfica's top foreign goalscorer for more than twenty years. He was later surpassed by Paraguayan international Óscar Cardozo (172 goals) and Brazilian international Jonas (137 goals).

International career
Magnusson earned 30 caps for the Sweden national team, and played in the 1990 FIFA World Cup finals in Italy where he suffered an injury that made him miss nearly one year of football. His debut came on 22 August 1984, as he started in a 1–1 friendly draw to Mexico played in Malmö.

Post-retirement
Sixteen years after his retirement, Magnusson made a short comeback to the footballing scene. He accepted an invitation from old club Benfica to take part in a charity match to raise money for victims of the Haiti earthquake, on 25 January 2010, which also coincided with the 68th birthday of club legend Eusébio: his team, Benfica All Stars, consisted of both retired and current Benfica players, which played "against" Zidane XI, a team consisting of players hand-picked by former French legend Zinedine Zidane.

Even though Magnusson had obviously gained a considerable amount of weight since his active days of footballing, and made the crowd laugh on several occasions (including two occasions where he fell while trying to dominate the ball), he entered the pitch in the closing minutes, and was cheered by an adoring crowd with chants of "Mats Magnusson".

Career statistics

International 

International goals
Scores and results list Sweden's goal tally first, score column indicates score after each Magnusson goal.

Honours
Benfica
Primeira Liga: 1988–89, 1990–91
Supertaça Cândido de Oliveira: 1989
Taça de Portugal Runner-up: 1988–89
European Cup Runner-up: 1987–88, 1989–90

Malmö
Allsvenskan: 1985, 1986, 1987
Svenska Cupen: 1983–84, 1985–86
Individual
Primeira Liga top scorer: 1989–90

References

External links

1963 births
Living people
Sportspeople from Helsingborg
Swedish footballers
Association football forwards
Allsvenskan players
Malmö FF players
Helsingborgs IF players
Swiss Super League players
Servette FC players
Primeira Liga players
S.L. Benfica footballers
Sweden international footballers
1990 FIFA World Cup players
Sweden under-21 international footballers
Sweden youth international footballers
Swedish expatriate footballers
Expatriate footballers in Switzerland
Expatriate footballers in Portugal
Swedish expatriate sportspeople in Portugal
Swedish expatriate sportspeople in Switzerland